SmartFrame is an online image delivery service that attempts to prevent viewers from downloading or copying the images it serves, and to discourage them from taking screenshots of such images. It is sold by SmartFrame Technologies, founded in 2015, who describe its methodology as "image streaming".

Clients 

Organisations using SmartFrame include:

 Historic England
 Tate
 Coventry University

References

External links 

 
 "Liberating out-of-copyright photos from SmartFrame's DRM" (blog post)

Web software